The 2001 Texas Tech Red Raiders football team represented Texas Tech University as a member of the Big 12 Conference during the 2001 NCAA Division I-A football season. In their second season under head coach Mike Leach, the Red Raiders compiled a 7–5 record (4–4 against Big 12 opponents), finished in a tie for third place in Southern Division of the Big 12, lost to Iowa in the 2001 Alamo Bowl, and outscored opponents by a combined total of 402 to 281. The team played its home games at Jones SBC Stadium in Lubbock, Texas.

Previous season
The Red Raiders finished the 2000 season with an overall record of 7–6, 3–5 in Big 12 play, to finish fourth in the Big 12 South. The team was invited to the Galleryfurniture.com Bowl, where they lost 27–40 to East Carolina.

NFL Draft

Tackle Kris Kocurek was drafted in the 6th round (181st overall) by the Seattle Seahawks.

Schedule

Personnel

Game summaries

New Mexico

at UTEP

The game was initially scheduled to take place on September 13, but was then postponed following the September 11 attacks. The game was eventually canceled on September 21 when the two teams could not agree on a date to reschedule that would work for both. Texas Tech would eventually play Stephen F. Austin to make up for the lost game.

vs. North Texas

at Texas

Kansas

The Red Raiders would not lose to the Jayhawks again until October 26, 2019, with Kansas defeating Texas Tech 37–34 in Lawrence.

Kansas State

at Nebraska

at Baylor

Texas A&M

at Oklahoma State

Oklahoma

Stephen F. Austin

vs. Iowa (Alamo Bowl)

References

Texas Tech
Texas Tech Red Raiders football seasons
Texas Tech Red Raiders football